This is a list of notable events in music that took place in 1554.

Events 
Johann Walter is appointed court composer for Moritz, Duke of Saxony, in Dresden.
Vigevano Cathedral's first organ is built by Gian Giacomo Antegnati.

Publications 
Pierre Certon – First book of psalms in lute tablature (Paris: Michel Fezendat), arranged by Guillaume Morlaye
Ippolito Ciera –  (Madrigals of the Labyrinth), first book of madrigals for four voices (Venice: Girolamo Scotto)
Pierre Clereau
4 Masses for four voices (Paris: Nicolas Du Chemin)
 (Requiem mass with two motets) (Paris: Nicolas Du Chemin)
Costanzo Festa –  for four voices (Venice: Girolamo Scotto), published posthumously
Giulio Fiesco – First book of madrigals for four voices (Venice: Antonio Gardano)
Miguel de Fuenllana –  (Sevilla: Martin de Montesdoca), arrangements for vihuela of works by various composers
Hoste da Reggio
First book of madrigals for five voices (Venice: Girolamo Scotto)
Second book of madrigals for four voices (Venice: Girolamo Scotto)
Third book of madrigals for four voices (Venice: Girolamo Scotto)
First book of madrigals for three voices (Milan: Francesco & Simone Moscheni)
Jacquet of Mantua – First book of masses for five voices (Venice: Girolamo Scotto)
Jean de Latre – Lamentations for three, four, five, and six voices (Maastricht: Jacob Baethen)
Philippe de Monte – First book of madrigals for five voices (Rome: Valerio & Luigi Dorico)
Guillaume Morlaye – First book of psalms by Pierre Certon in lute tablature (Paris: Michel Fezendat)
Jan Nasco – First book of madrigals for four voices (Venice: Antonio Gardano)
Giovanni Pierluigi da Palestrina – First book of masses (Rome: Valerio & Luigi Dorico)
Pierre Phalèse (ed.) – Ninth book of motets, for five and six voices (Leuven: Pierre Phalèse), contains only compositions by Pierre de Manchicourt
Dominique Phinot – Second book of motets for five voices (Pesaro: Bartolomeo Cesano)
Francesco Portinaro – Second book of madrigals for five voices (Venice: Antonio Gardano)

Sacred music 
Thomas Tallis – Puer natus est nobis

Births 
May 20 – Paolo Bellasio, composer (died 1594)
date unknown – Cosimo Bottegari, Italian lutenist and composer (died 1620)
probable – Emmanuel Adriaenssen, Dutch lutenist and composer (died 1604)

Deaths 
February 6 – Arnold von Bruck, composer (born c.1500)
February 24 – Philip van Wilder, lutenist and composer (born c.1500)
September 25 – Richard Sampson, composer

References

 
Music
16th century in music
Music by year